John Irving Whalley (September 14, 1902 – March 8, 1980) was a Republican member of the U.S. House of Representatives from Pennsylvania.

Early life and business activities
J. Irving Whalley was born in Barnesboro, Pennsylvania to Isabella (née Ashurst) and James H. Whalley, both English immigrants. He took his first job at age 10 in a Windber, Pennsylvania, grocery store. By age 14 he was working at the local Ford garage.

Twelve years later he owned the dealership, after having worked as a mechanic, salesman, bookkeeper, delivery man and driving instructor. Whalley purchased a second dealership three years later, and would open or acquire 11 more before World War II. He eventually established a chain of 13 automobile dealerships in central and western Pennsylvania.

Public service
Whalley campaigned on issues related to the automotive industry. He fought against taxes that were considered unfair to new car buyers. Whalley also secured support for improvements to the Pennsylvania turnpike and campaigned for better highways everywhere.

He was a member of advisory board of Johnstown College branch of the University of Pittsburgh.  He was chairman of the  Somerset County Redevelopment Authority and the Windber Planning Commission.  He served as a member of the Windber School Board from 1935 to 1947.  He was a member of the Pennsylvania State House of Representatives, representing one of Somerset County's at-large seats, from 1951 to 1954. He also served in the Pennsylvania State Senate from 1955 to 1960, representing the 36th district. He was appointed by President Richard Nixon to serve as delegate to United Nations for the 1969 session.

U.S. House of Representatives
He was elected as a Republican to the Eighty-sixth Congress, originally by special election to fill the vacancy caused by the death of United States Representative Doug Elliott. He was subsequently reelected to the five succeeding Congresses, and was a high-ranking member of the House Foreign Relations Committee. He retired in 1972.

The following year, Whalley was accused of taking staff salary kickbacks, but said the money was used for office purposes only. He pleaded guilty to one count of mail fraud and two counts of obstruction of justice, was fined $11,000 and served three years probation.

Later
He was inducted into the Automotive Hall of Fame in 1981.
Whalley died at the age of 77 and is buried in Grandview Cemetery, Johnstown.

See also
List of American federal politicians convicted of crimes
List of federal political scandals in the United States

References

The Political Graveyard

|-

|-

1902 births
1980 deaths
20th-century American businesspeople
20th-century American politicians
American automobile salespeople
American people of English descent
Businesspeople from Pennsylvania
Republican Party members of the Pennsylvania House of Representatives
Pennsylvania politicians convicted of crimes
Republican Party Pennsylvania state senators
People convicted of obstruction of justice
People from Cambria County, Pennsylvania
People from Somerset County, Pennsylvania
Politicians convicted of mail and wire fraud
Republican Party members of the United States House of Representatives from Pennsylvania
School board members in Pennsylvania